Ochradenus socotranus is a species of plant in the Resedaceae family. It is endemic to Yemen.  Its natural habitat is rocky areas.

References

Endemic flora of Socotra
Resedaceae
Least concern plants
Taxonomy articles created by Polbot